The Speaker of the Bihar Legislative Assembly is the presiding officer of the Legislative Assembly of Bihar, the main law-making body for the Indian state of Bihar. The Speaker is elected in the very first meeting of the Bihar Legislative Assembly after the general elections for a term of 5 years from amongst the members of the assembly. Speakers hold office until ceasing to be a member of the assembly or resigning from the office. The Speaker can be removed from office by a resolution passed in the assembly by an effective majority of its members. In the absence of Speaker, the meeting is presided by the Deputy Speaker.

List

References 

Bihar Legislative Assembly
Lists of legislative speakers in India
Speakers of the Bihar Legislative Assembly